Allen Solomon Burns (31 August 1870 – 8 November 1925) was an Australian rules footballer who played for the South Melbourne Football Club in the Victorian Football League (VFL).

Born in the small Victoria town of Steiglitz, Burns often played on the half-forward line, and was noted for kicking goals from quite acute angles. He was the leading goalkicker for South Melbourne in 1894.

He was the younger brother of Peter Burns a legend of the game who played with South Melbourne and Geelong. In a VFA match in 1896 where the brothers were in rival teams, Allen made a significant contribution towards South's victory over Geelong.

Allen Burns died in South Melbourne at the age of 55.

References

External links 

1870 births
1925 deaths
Australian rules footballers from Victoria (Australia)
Sydney Swans players